Aakenustunturi is a fell in Kittilä in northern Finland.

History
The fell had two fatal airplane crashes during World War II.

On 24 February 1943, a Junkers Ju 52 of the German Luftwaffe was shot down and crashed into the fell.

Later, during the Lapland War, Air Force Captain Paavo Kahla, a Knight of the Mannerheim Cross and Sergeant Jouko Liinamaa went missing on a reconnaissance flight on October 23, 1944. Their remains were found by a reindeer herder, alongside their shot down Fokker C.X in spring 1945.

Landscape
The fell is considered a wild oasis between the fells in the north and is a popular destination for hikers. In December 2004, the fell was incorporated into the Pallas-Yllästunturi National Park.

External links
Exact location on a world map

References 

Kittilä
Mountains of Finland
Landforms of Lapland (Finland)